Stolper may refer to

 Aleksandr Stolper (1907-1979) - a Russian/Soviet film director
 Armin Stolper - a German dramatist
 Daniel J. Stolper - an American musician (oboist)
 Edward Stolper - an American geologist
 Gustav Stolper - an Austrian economist, journalist and politician in the Weimar Republic
 Matthew Stolper - an American Assyriologist at the University of Chicago.
 Pinchas Stolper - an American rabbi
 Toni Stolper (born Antonie Kassowitz)- an Austrian journalist, wife of Gustav Stolper
 Wolfgang Friedrich Stolper - an American economist, son of Gustav Stolper
 Lt. Kevin Stolper - a fictional character in the TV-series 'Law and Order'